Martínez is a city in San Isidro Partido, Buenos Aires Province. It is part of Greater Buenos Aires, and effectively a suburb of Buenos Aires. It is served by a commuter train service, the Tren de la Costa tourist railway line, and many buses.

Some areas of Martínez, especially near Avenida del Libertador, are relatively affluent. That area is considered rather safe.  Unicenter is a major shopping centre.  Some of the better-known cafés are Café Victoria and Café Martinez. A favoured street for shopping is Calle Alvear.

A UBA (Buenos Aires University) building is located in Martínez.

The Martinez local government has a recycling program.

Martínez is distinct from  Villa Martínez de Hoz and Coronel Martínez de Hoz.

UN/LOCODE is ARMAR.

Education

Some of the schools located in Martínez are Colegio Naciones Unidas, Colegio Santa Teresa del Niño Jesús, and Polivalente de Arte de San Isidro.

The area once had a German school, Nordschule of the Nordschule und Goetheschule.

References

External links
 History of Martínez
 News site for San Isidro Partido

Populated places in Buenos Aires Province
San Isidro Partido
Cities in Argentina
Argentina